G.I. Joe (March 24, 1943 – June 3, 1961) was a pigeon noted for his service in the United States Army Pigeon Service. The bird is part of the homing pigeons used during World War I and World War II for communication and reconnaissance purposes. G.I. Joe had the name tag, Pigeon USA43SC6390. He was hatched in March 1943, in Algiers, North Africa and underwent a training for two-way homing pigeons perfected at Fort Monmouth, in New Jersey.

During the Italian Campaign of World War II, G.I. Joe saved the lives of the inhabitants of the village of Calvi Vecchia, Italy, and of the British troops of 56th (London) Infantry Division occupying it. Air support had been previously requested against German positions at Calvi Vecchia on 18 October 1943. However, the 169th (London) Infantry Brigade attacked and won back the village from the Germans ahead of schedule but they were unable to transmit a message via radio to call off the planned American air raid. G.I. Joe was dispatched as a last resort to carry the message and arrived in the air base just in time to avoid the Allied air force from bombing their own men. G.I. Joe flew this 20-mile distance in an impressive 20 minutes, just as the planes were preparing to take off for the target. Over 100 men were saved.

On 4 November 1946, G.I. Joe was presented the Dickin Medal for gallantry by Major-General Charles Keightley at the Tower of London. The citation credits him with "the most outstanding flight made by a United States Army homing pigeon in World War II". The award is also known as the equivalent of the Victoria Cross or the Medal of Honor for animals. G.I. Joe was the 29th and the first non-British recipient of the medal. In 2019 he was also posthumously awarded the Animals in War & Peace Medal of Bravery.

After World War II, he was housed at the U.S. Army's Churchill Loft at Fort Monmouth, in New Jersey along with 24 other heroic pigeons. He died at the Detroit Zoological Gardens at the age of eighteen, and was mounted and displayed at the U.S. Army Communications Electronics Museum at Fort Monmouth.

See also
List of individual birds

References

Individual domesticated pigeons
Recipients of the Dickin Medal
1943 animal births
1961 animal deaths